Nicky Henderson (born 8 February 1969) is a Scottish former professional footballer, who played for Raith Rovers, Cowdenbeath, Falkirk, Partick Thistle, Hamilton Academical, Clyde, Stenhousemuir and Stirling Albion.

His sons Liam and Ewan are also professional footballers.

References

External links

1969 births
Living people
Footballers from West Lothian
Scottish footballers
Association football midfielders
Raith Rovers F.C. players
Cowdenbeath F.C. players
Falkirk F.C. players
Partick Thistle F.C. players
Hamilton Academical F.C. players
Clyde F.C. players
Stenhousemuir F.C. players
Stirling Albion F.C. players
Broxburn Athletic F.C. players
Scottish Football League players